The Golden Microphone was a music contest annually held between 1965 and 1968 in Turkey. It was organized by the newspaper Hürriyet. In 1960s, most of the Turkish popular music melodies were either songs from west Europe with Turkish lyrics or traditional Turkish folk melodies played with western instruments. The goal of the contest was to encourage the development of popular Turkish music either by new compositions or by using domestic sources.
More formally, Hürriyet announced the goal of the contest as "Redirecting Turkish music using technique and style of the western music as well as the instruments of the western music"

Winners

Later years
Altın Mikrofon was a milestone in Turkish music. Although Hürriyet gave up organizing the contest after 1968, two other newspapers tried to continue: Günaydın in 1972 and Saklambaç in 1979. But these later contests unlike the earlier contests, didn't attracted much attention and they too gave up. The results of these were as follows:

References

External links
1967 winner 
1968 winner 

Music festivals in Turkey
Music competitions
1965 establishments in Turkey
1979 disestablishments in Turkey
Turkish music awards
Pop music awards